Richard Christiansen may refer to:

 Richard Christiansen (politician) (1928–2001), American politician, member of the Ohio House of Representatives
 Richard Christiansen (critic) (1931–2022), American theatre critic for the Chicago Tribune
 Dick Christiansen, Canadian football player